Knud Langeland (October 27, 1813 – February 8, 1886) was an American editor, farmer, and politician.

Born in Samnanger, Norway, Langeland taught school in Norway. In 1843, Langeland emigrated to the United States and settled on a farm in Racine County, Wisconsin Territory. Langeland was the editor of the newspaper Democraten, published in Racine, Wisconsin. In 1860, Langeland served in the Wisconsin State Assembly and was a Republican. In 1866, Langeland became the editor of the newspaper Skandinaven, which was published in Chicago, Illinois. Langeland retired because of ill health and died in Milwaukee, Wisconsin.

Notes

1813 births
1886 deaths
Norwegian schoolteachers
Norwegian emigrants to the United States
People from Samnanger
People from Racine County, Wisconsin
Politicians from Chicago
Editors of Illinois newspapers
Editors of Wisconsin newspapers
Farmers from Wisconsin
19th-century American politicians
Republican Party members of the Wisconsin State Assembly